Kwang-hyok, also spelled Gwang-hyeok, is a Korean masculine given name. Its meaning differs based on the hanja used to write each syllable of the name. There are 13 hanja with the reading "kwang" and nine hanja with the reading "hyok" on the South Korean government's official list of hanja which may be registered for use in given names.

People with this name include:
Kim Kwang-hyok (born 1985), North Korean football player
Choi Kwang-hyouk (born 1986/1987), North Korean-born South Korean sledge hockey player
Ri Kwang-hyok (born 1987), North Korean football player
Kim Kwang-hyok (athlete) (born 1988), North Korean long distance runner
Lee Gwang-hyeok (born 1995), South Korean football midfielder (K-League)

See also
List of Korean given names

References

Korean masculine given names